Gaston 19, written and drawn by Franquin, is the last album of the Gaston Lagaffe series ever published. It was published in December 1999, after Franquin's death, by Marsu Productions. It has 44 pages.

Story
The album contains some mini-récits, advertisements and drawings.

Inventions
 paint brush with tank and battery : brush so efficient that it paint also the user
 electric roller skates : roller skates without brakes nor switch
 miniature drill : highly efficient drill that can accidentally cause some damages
 small ventilator: too efficient, it flies away
 fan with motor: fan with battery to be placed on the wrist, it also allows someone to fly
 electric cigar-cutter : this cigar-cutter not only cut cigars but also grind them
 shaving brush with rotary hair: with too powerful batteries, it can have unexpected effects (Gaston 19)
 bicycle on baterries: batteries are placed in the frame of the bike
 heating soles: non-slip soles equipped with a heating system against black ice
 miniature electric doll: doll of Prunelle
 fire-extinger walkie-talkie: to communicate easily and avoiding being exposed
 antifreeze : this antifreeze makes bubbles
 radio-controlled bin

Background
The album is not part of the initial series, which is made up of 16 albums, numbered from 0 to 15. It is the last album of a new series. Initially, the new series, launched after the author's death, was made up of 18 albums, but some works had been published only in Spirou magazine but never in albums, and other content had never been published anywhere.

References
 Gaston Lagaffe definitive series on the official website
 Publication in Spirou  on bdoubliées.com.

External links
 Official website 

1999 graphic novels
Comics by André Franquin